Farrell is a city in western Mercer County, Pennsylvania, along the Shenango River. The population was 4,258 at the 2020 census. It is part of the Youngstown–Warren metropolitan area.

History
Once dubbed "The Magic City," Farrell sprang up practically overnight when a steel mill was constructed in 1901 on a plain bordering the Shenango River, near Sharon, in what was then part of Hickory Township (now Hermitage).

The community name was at the beginning South Sharon. In 1912, the population reached 10,000. At that time, the residents of the new city elected to take the name of Farrell, after industrialist James A. Farrell.

The community was incorporated as the Borough of South Sharon in 1916; its population peaked at over 15,000 in 1920 and its status was elevated to a third-class city in 1932. In 1939, artist  Virginia Wood Riggs was commissioned to paint the mural Myths of Vulcan and Juno in the towns post office. The mural was painted over in 1966.

The mill, which eventually became known as the Roemer Works of Sharon Steel Corporation, would serve as the community's lifeblood until 1992, when it was liquidated after filing bankruptcy.  Many of the assets were sold at auction to Britain-based Caparo Corporation and later to Swiss steelmaker Duferco, which operates the plant today. Farrell was designated a financially distressed municipality in 1987 by the state of Pennsylvania.

Despite years of population and industrial decline, Farrell has made progress in rebuilding itself due to new industrial investments on tax abated land and several new housing starts.

Demographics

As of the census of 2000, there were 6,050 people, 2,504 households, and 1,620 families residing in the city. The population density was 2,589.1 people per square mile (998.3/km2).  There were 2,752 housing units at an average density of 1,177.7 per square mile (454.1/km2). The racial composition of the city was 50.28% White, 46.71% African American, 0.12% Native American, 0.20% Asian, 0.02% Pacific Islander, 0.30% from other races, and 2.38% from two or more races. Hispanic or Latino of any race were 0.66% of the population.

There were 2,504 households, out of which 27.0% had children under the age of 18 living with them, 36.0% were married couples living together, 24.4% had a female householder with no husband present, and 35.3% were non-families. 31.5% of all households were made up of individuals, and 17.9% had someone living alone who was 65 years of age or older. The average household size was 2.37 and the average family size was 2.96.

In the city the population was spread out, with 25.6% under the age of 18, 7.4% from 18 to 24, 23.6% from 25 to 44, 20.8% from 45 to 64, and 22.6% who were 65 years of age or older. The median age was 40 years. For every 100 females, there were 80.2 males. For every 100 females age 18 and over, there were 74.2 males.

The median income for a household in the city was $22,659, and the median income for a family was $28,935. Males had a median income of $32,800 versus $20,729 for females. The per capita income for the city was $14,532. About 24.0% of families and 26.4% of the population were below the poverty line, including 47.5% of those under age 18 and 9.6% of those age 65 or over.

Economy
The city government provides numerous incentives to entice new businesses to locate within its borders.  Today, some of the major contributors to Farrell's business base include:
Duferco Farrell Corp. (steel processing) 
First General Services of Western PA. (Property Restoration) 
Kalco Metals Inc. (specialty alloys) 
NLMK Pennsylvania, a subsidiary of Novolipetsk Steel
Precision Steel Services (roll forming) 
Premier Hydraulics Inc. (hydraulic parts manufacturing)
Sharon Custom Metal Forming (roll forming and welding) 
Sharon Packing Co. (food processing) 
UPMC Horizon Hospital, Farrell Campus 

Farrell emerged Feb. 8, 2019 from Act 47 provisions. The Act provides for municipalities that are near bankruptcy. Farrell had been under Act 47 since 1987, as Pennsylvania's first municipality to enter  financially distressed municipality status.

Media

Television 
Because of Farrell's location near the Pennsylvania/Ohio border, it is served by WKBN-TV (CBS), WFMJ-TV (NBC), WYTV (ABC), WYFX-LD (Fox) and WBCB (CW), all broadcast from nearby Youngstown, OH.

Radio 
Farrell is served by AM radio stations such as WLOA (1470 AM) (Farrell, PA), WPIC (790 AM) (Sharon, PA), WKBN (570 AM) (Youngstown, OH) and FM radio stations such as WYFM/"Y-103" (102.9 FM) (Sharon, PA), WLLF/"The River" (96.7 FM) (Mercer, PA), WYLE/"Willie 95.1" (95.1 FM) (Grove City, PA), WMXY/"Mix 98.9" (98.9 FM) (Youngstown, OH).

Notable people
 Jack Marin - born October 12, 1944 is an American former professional basketball player. A 201 cm (6-foot, 7-inch) guard/forward from Duke University, Marin was valedictorian of his high school class at Farrell High School.
Russell L. Caldwell, historian and college professor
 Gravelle Craig, head men's basketball coach, Bethune-Cookman University
 Randy Crowder, former NFL football player with the Miami Dolphins and Tampa Bay Buccaneers
 Judson Flint, NFL player
 E. L. Konigsburg, Newbery Award winning author
 Marc L. Marks, politician and lawyer
 Duke Mitchell, actor and comedian
 Neal Russo, columnist for the St. Louis Post-Dispatch and The Sporting News
 Willie Somerset, ABA All-Star professional basketball player
 Billy Soose, Middleweight Boxing Champion
 Lorenzo Styles, former NFL football player with the Atlanta Falcons and St. Louis Rams
 Leo Yankevich, new formalist poet and editor

References

External links
 City website
 Farrell, PA/city-data
 Farrell, PA/history

Cities in Mercer County, Pennsylvania
Populated places established in 1899
Cities in Pennsylvania
1899 establishments in Pennsylvania